Kristy Starling is the eponymous debut album by Kristy Starling. It was released by Warner Bros. Records on April 22, 2003. The album consist of Contemporary Christian songs, as well as a cover of LeAnn Rimes' 2000 hit song, "I Need You" and Josh Groban's  "To Where You Are". The album peaked at number twenty-four on the Billboard Contemporary Christian.

Critical response

Aaron Latham of Allmusic praised the album stating, "All the elements are there for a hit record."

Track listing

Personnel 
Credits for Kristy Starling are adapted from Allmusic.
 Kristy Starling – lead vocals, backing vocals
 Pete Kipley – programming, acoustic guitar, electric guitar, bass, string arrangements
 Tim Akers – acoustic piano
 Dan Muckala – programming, string arrangements
 Billy Mann – programming, guitars, backing vocals
 David Foster – acoustic piano, arrangements 
 Richard Marx – keyboards, arrangements 
 Pete Wallace – programming
 Jerry McPherson – electric guitar
 Alex Nifong – acoustic guitar, electric guitar
 Chris Rodriguez – acoustic guitar
 Michael Thompson – guitars
 Dan Warner – guitars
 Tracy Ferrie – bass
 Mark Hill – bass
 Dan Needham – drums
 Jochem van der Saag – drum programming
 Eric Darken – percussion
 Rob Mathes – string arrangements and conductor 
 Daniel O'Lannerghty – orchestration
 William Ross – arrangements
 The Nashville String Machine – strings
 Lisa Cochran – backing vocals
 Nirva Dorsaint – backing vocals
 Desmond Pringle – backing vocals
 Erin O'Donnell – backing vocals

Production 
 Lee Bridges – assistant, digital editing
 Tammie Harris Cleek – creative director
 David Cole – engineer
 Tom Coyne – mastering
 David Foster – executive producer, producer
Jaymes Foster-Levy – A&R
 Humberto Gatica – mixing
 David Kaufman – wardrobe
 Barry Landis – executive producer
 Billy Mann – producer, mixing
 Nick Marshall – assistant
 Richard Marx – producer, arrangements 
 J.R. McNeely – engineer
 Shawn McSpadden – A&R
 Dan Muckala – producer
 Bridgett Evans O'Lannerghty – production coordination
 Matt Prock – engineer
 Dave Reitzas – engineer
 Christian Robles – assistant
 Alejandro Rodriguez – mix assistant
 Ray Roper – design
 John Saylor – assistant
 Lisa Sciascia – photography
 Melanie Shelley – hair stylist, make-up
 Dan Shike – assistant
 F. Reid Shippen – engineer, mixing
 Jay Smith – design

Chart

References

2003 albums